A wooden fish, also known as a Chinese temple block, wooden bell, or muyu, is a type of woodblock that originated from East Asia that is used by monks and lay people in the Mahayana tradition of Buddhism.  They are used by Buddhist ceremonies in China, Korea, Japan, Vietnam and other Asian countries. They may be referred to as a Chinese block, Korean block or, rarely, as a skull. 

Wooden fish often used in rituals usually involving the recitation of sutras, mantras, or other Buddhist texts. In Chan Buddhism, the wooden fish serve to maintain rhythm during chanting. In Pure Land Buddhism, they are used when chanting the name of Amitabha.

Wooden fish are often (in Chinese temples) placed on the left of the altar, alongside a bell bowl, its metal percussion counterpart. Wooden fish often rest on a small embroidered cushion to prevent unpleasant knocking sounds caused from the fish lying on the surface of a hard table or ground, as well as to avoid damage to the instrument.

Mythical origins 

Although the wooden fish originated in China, there are many tales associated with its invention. One Buddhist legend says that a monk went to India to acquire sutras but on his way he found the way blocked by a wide, flooded river. A fish offered to carry the monk across the river because it wanted to atone for a crime it had committed when it was a human. Its simple request was that on the monk's way to obtain sutras, he should ask the Buddha to guide the fish on a method to attain Bodhisattvahood. The monk agreed to the fish's request and continued his quest. On his return to China after 17 years with the scriptures, he came upon the flooded river. The same fish asked the monk if he had made the request to Buddha but the monk said he had forgotten. The furious fish splashed him into the river. A passing fisherman saved the drowning monk but all the sutras had been lost in the river. Filled with anger at the fish, the monk made a wooden effigy of a fish head which he beat with a wooden hammer. To his surprise, each time he hit the wooden fish, it made the sound of a Chinese character. He became so happy that he beat the wooden fish regularly. After a few years the monk had got back the lost scriptures he had lost to the flood from the mouth of the wooden fish.

Usage

Traditional versions
The original type of wooden fish is literally in the shape of a fish. Along with a large temple bell and drum, It is found suspended in front of Buddhist monasteries. When proceeding with various duties (such as eating, lectures, or chores), a monk and a supervisor utilize the instrument to call all monastics to go to their tasks. Historically, this was the first wooden fish developed, which gradually evolved into the round wooden fish used by modern Buddhists.

The instrument is carved with fish scales on its top, and a carving of two fish heads embracing a pearl on the handle (to symbolize unity), hence the instrument is called a wooden fish for that reason.  In Buddhism the fish, which never sleeps, symbolizes wakefulness. Therefore, it is to remind the chanting monks to concentrate on their sutra where recitation of texts is necessary and the sound symbolizes wakeful attention. It can also symbolize wealth and abundance. At funerals, the processions walk in a slow and unison rhythm while sounding wooden fishes. Other purposes include prayers for rain. In Confucianism, the wooden fish is struck at specific intervals to signify certain stages of ceremonies at temple. In Buddhism, it is struck during chants of Buddha's name.

In Korean Buddhism, wooden fish have seen broader use. Two separate words are used in Korean to distinguish different types of wooden fish. Moktak (hangeul: 목탁; hanja: 木鐸) refers to a smaller-sized, hand-held variant, whereas mogeo (hangeul: 목어; hanja: 木魚) means a full-sized piece that resembles a fish or dragon, with a hollow core. Moktak, a small version of mogeo (wooden fish), can come with ornaments, or not, and is more oblong in shape. It has a handle for easy carrying during portable uses. Mogeo are usually hung from the ceiling and played with two sticks drummed from the hollowed-out bottom.

In Japan, wooden fish are called mokugyo (kanji: 木魚; hiragana: もくぎょ), and some huge specimens found in Buddhist temples weigh more than 300 kg.

The Vietnamese name for the wooden fish is mõ, and the Manchu name is toksitu (ᡨᠣᡴᠰᡳᡨᡠ).

Modern types
The most common ones in use remain the traditional instruments that are round in shape and often made out of wood. However, other materials are now used as well such as composite plastic. All instruments are hollow with a ridge outside that provide the hollow sound when struck. The hollow tone differs among wooden fish because of their size, material, and the size of its internal hollow.  Often the mallet used to strike the fish has a rubber coated tip to provide a muffled, but clear sound when struck. A simplified form is given in the temple block.

Gallery

See also
 Fish drum
 Bell tower (wat)
 Drum tower (Chinese Buddhism)
 Drum tower (Asia)

References

External links

Idiophones
Chinese musical instruments
Zen
Buddhist ritual implements
Fish in Buddhism
Drum kit components
Sacred musical instruments